Mirko pl. Vidaković (October 29, 1924 – August 15, 2002) was a Croatian botanist and dendrologist and the expert for the genetics of the forest trees.

Biography

Vidaković was born in Lemeš, Bačka. He attained a professional qualification of engineer of forestry before 1949, when he was first employed as a lecturer at the Faculty of Forestry of the University of Zagreb.

He was a full member of Croatian Academy of Sciences and Arts (HAZU) since 1981.

He was the head of the arboretum in Trsteno since 1970.

He worked as UNDP's and FAO's expert in Pakistan, Vietnam and Hungary.

Together with forestry of Našice, in 1996 he founded first clone seminal plantation of pedunculate oak in Croatia.

He died in Zagreb at the age of 77.

Works
His works were published in various editions from international scientific gatherings, symposiums and consultations, mostly in area of ecological valorization of littoral carst, mechanization of agriculture, adaptation of forests to climate change etc.

He published his works in Annales forestales.

Golosjemenjače, (co-author) 2004
Obična bukva (Fagus sylvatica L.) u Hrvatskoj = Common beech (Fagus sylvatica L.) in Croatia , (co-author), 2003
Obična jela (Abies alba Mill.) u Hrvatskoj = Silver fair (Abies alba Mill.) in Croatia, (co-author), 2001
Estimation of genetic gain in a progeny trial of pedunculate oak (Quercus robur L.), (co-author) 2000
Hrast lužnjak (Quercus robur L.) u Hrvatskoj = Pedunculate oak (Quercus robur L.) in Croatia, (co-author), 1996
Experimental plots of some hard pine hybrid families in Croatia, (co-author) 1995
Izravna sjetva da ili ne?, (co-author), 1994
Tehnika za obradu tla, sjetvu i borbu protiv korova , (co-author), 1994
Zrinjevac : spomenica : priroda, vrtovi, perivoji i uresno raslinstvo u Zagrebu, (co-author), 1995
Novosti u tehnici obrade tla, (co-author), 1993
Hrvatski umjetnici za Trsteno = Kroatische Kuenstler fuer das Arboretum Trsteno = Croatian artist for the Arboretum of Trsteno, (co-author) 1993
Arboretum Brijuni, (co-author), 1993
Radovi na podizanju klonske sjemenske plantaže hrasta lužnjaka na području Š. G. "Krndija" i Š. G. "Papuk", (co-author), 1992
Čuvanje genskih resursa šumskog i hortikulturnog drveća i grmlja u Hrvatskoj , 1992
Doprinos OLT-a integralnoj tehnici biljne proizvodnje , 1992
Svjedočanstva: razaranje Dubrovnika, (co-author with few HAZU-members), 1992
Kako agregatirati traktor za oranje? , 1991
Growth of some interspecific hybrid pine seedlings and their cuttings , (co-author), 1991
Prilog sanaciji erozije na području izvorišta rijeke Une, (co-author), 1991
Sjetva jednosjemenim pneumatskim sijačicama , (co-author), 1990
Uspijevanje nekih vrsta i hibrida dvoigličavih borova na području Arboretuma Trsteno , (co-author), 1990
Arboretum Lisičine, (co-author), 1986
Genetika i oplemenjivanje šumskog drveća , (co-author) 1985
Zakorjenjivanje reznica ranog i kasnog hrasta lužnjaka = The rooting of cuttings of the early and late flushing Slavonian oak , (co-author), 1983
Četinjače : morfologija i varijabilnost, 1982, 1991 (in English) i 1993
Genetics of Pinus peuce Gris = Genetik der Pinus peuce Gris = Genetika Pinus peuce Gris , (co-author), 1978
Genetics of European black pine (Pinus nigra Arn.) , 1974
Oplemenjivanje ekonomski važnijih vrsta šumskog drveća jugoistočne Slavonije , 1974
Prilog proučavanju morfološke varijabilnosti spontanih križanaca između alepskog i brucijskog bora, (co-author), 1974

Sources
 Umro akademik Mirko Vidaković, Vjesnik, 17 August 2002

External links
 Imenik hrvatskih šumara Biography
 In memoriam
 Spomen ploča
 Mirko Vidaković biography at the Croatian Academy of Sciences and Arts (HAZU)
 Klonska plantaža hrasta lužnjaka

1924 births
2002 deaths
Croatian biologists
Croats of Vojvodina
Members of the Croatian Academy of Sciences and Arts
Forestry academics
University of Zagreb alumni
Academic staff of the University of Zagreb
Dendrologists
Croatian foresters
Bunjevci
20th-century biologists
Yugoslav biologists